1974 ACC tournament may refer to:

 1974 ACC men's basketball tournament
 1974 Atlantic Coast Conference baseball tournament